Leovanna Orlandini Febres-Cordero (born August 27, 1978 in Guayaquil) is a former Miss Ecuador contestant, international model, architect, and actress, also she is known for being León Febres-Cordero's granddaughter.

Early life
Leovanna was born in Guayaquil on August 27, 1978; she is León Febres-Cordero grand daughter. She is graduated as Architect in UESS and she is an international model.

Miss Ecuador
Orlandini competed in Miss Ecuador 2003 where she was 2nd Runner-up. She has also won Miss Sedal and Miss Photogenic awards.

Actress
Orlandini is also an actress, she played as Lucía in Porcelain Horse film.

References 

South American women
Living people
Ecuadorian beauty pageant winners
Ecuadorian female models
People from Guayaquil
1978 births
21st-century Ecuadorian women